Mamadou Dia (18 July 1910 – 25 January 2009) was a Senegalese politician who served as the first Prime Minister of Senegal from 1957 until 1962, when he was forced to resign and was subsequently imprisoned amidst allegations that he was planning to stage a military coup to overthrow President Léopold Sédar Senghor.

Biography

Early life and education 
Of rural origin, Mamadou Dia was born in Khombole, in the Thies Region of Senegal, on 18 July 1910. His father, a veteran turned into a policeman, played a key role in transmitting him faith to Sufi Islam and was an important example of rectitude.

Former pupil of the Blanchot elementary school in Saint-Louis, began his education in a Quranic school to later move into western education at the École William Ponty, principal training ground of the elite in French Africa in the 20s and 30s. Eventually, he persuaded graduate studies in economics at the University of Paris. Before entering politics (became motivated to so only after Vichy regime collapsed) in the early 1940s, he worked as journalist, teacher and school director.

In his book “Africa, the price of freedom” (2001, edited by L'Harmattan) he stated to believe to be actually born (according to some papers belonging to his father he had found) in July 1911.  It has been a teacher who made him one year older on official documents to allow him to pass the competition for the William Ponty school, as otherwise he would have been too young to candidate.

Political career 
Dia started life in politics in 1947 as a leader in the Grand Council of the Afrique occidentale française (AOF) and as Secretary General of the Senegalese Democratic Bloc (BDS) from the following year. He served in the French Senate from 1948 to 1956 and as deputy in the French National Assembly from 1956 to 1958, sitting with the parliamentary group of Overseas Independent (IOM). With Senghor, Dia formed the African Convention Party (PCA) in January 1957 from the BDS. When Charles de Gaulle proposed a referendum on the French community in 1958, the two leaders stand by two opposite positions: Dia is in favor of a break with France, while Senghor wants to keep Senegal in the community,

During his two terms as a senator, Mamadou Dia voted for the ratification of the Atlantic Pact (July 28, 1949), voted for the law Marie favorable to private education (September 12), and declared himself in favor of the ratification of the Treaty establishing the European Coal and Steel Community (1 st April 1952). On March 26, 1955, he opposed plans relating to the WEU, the end of the occupation in Germany, its entry into NATO and the Saar Agreement. It approved the draft law on state of emergency in Algeria (1 st April) and abstained on the draft electoral reform restoring the district election (15 November). He was also an active member of parliament, being a frequent speaker and devoting himself to the problems of the overseas territories.

Dia was one of the main figures (namely vice premier) of the abortive Mali Federation of Senegal and Sudanese Republic (later Mali) until its collapse. Once independence has been proclaimed on August 20, 1960, he became Prime minister, in tandem with Senghor as President of the Republic of Senegal who, as a Catholic in a largely Islamic country, valued having a widely connected and able Muslim as his deputy. His time served as Prime Minister was often controversial and his radical socialist views often clashed with those of the more moderate Senghor.

Departure from Senghor and imprisonment 
After slightly more than two years of legislature, Mamadou Dia was accused of plotting a coup against President Senghor. No proof has been provided to justify the accusations. It was taken at the time as a classic example of the difficulties of power sharing in new-born states: Dia embodied the summit of the State in a two-headed parliamentary system (economic and internal policy for him, foreign policy for the President).

However, different views with regards to the economy, played a major role: there was a serious liberal and pro-French versus conservatory and patriotic policy divide. In fact, Dia began to implement some of the ideas he had articulated in his book Réflexions sur l'Économie de l'Afrique Noire (1960), which rose concern among the Marabouts, the powerful religious leaders who controlled the groundnut business, and runs counter to French interests.

As result of the grave power struggle between the two former political allies, a group of dissident parliamentarians motivated by Senghor, tabled a motion of no confidence against the government, thus on Dia. He responded by invoking executive powers and ordering the army to lock the assembly building before the vote could be taken. Senghor charged it as an attempted coup, in turn calling out the army, which was in the majority loyal to him. Dia and several of his ministers were arrested and tried for treason. Eventually, he was forced to resign and subsequently imprisoned (initially sentenced to life in prison) in the eastern town of Kédougou, until 1974, but later pardoned (1974) and given amnesty (1976).

Late life 
His political power may have been broken but not his spirit. Dia attempted to restart his career in the early 1980s, once multiparty democracy had been introduced by Abdou Diouf, but the small party he led (the People Democratic Movement) found little support. Thus, he never returned to a position of power; however, he remained an iconic figure in Senegalese politics, retaining an intellectual and moral place in the country. He accompanied the Senegalese state during the years of decolonization and remained one of the main figures in the construction of modern Senegal. He gradually acquired the role of national treasure, as he continued regularly to write diatribes in the local press well into his 90s. He was noted for his attacks on the neo-liberal economic policies of the current president, Abdoulaye Wade, who ironically had been one of the lawyers who defended Dia in 1963. After his death on 25 January 2009 (at the age of 98, in Dakar), there was a massive outpouring of sentiment in national newspapers due to admiration for his obdurate attachment to principles.

"Dia ne s’est jamais defait de son idealism pour devenir un homme d’Etat"

Church and state relation 
When Leopold Senghor (Catholic) and Mamadou Dia (Muslim) led Senegal to independence they had very clear ideas of what ideological and philosophical values would have formed the basis of the new State. African socialism, spirituality and secularisms were the concepts to guide the country towards modernity and development with a spirit of tolerance and pluralism to define their project. The two figures were both fundamentally convinced, on the one hand, of the necessity of a secular state, and on the other, that religious fervor is a cultural energy essential for achieving modernization. And that is why they charged themselves and their fellow nation builders, the institutions, the party and especially the political discourse with the mission of realizing the ideal of a nation uplifted by the spirit, committed to secularism and thus, ultimately, prosperous.

Dia’s reflection on Islam (like those contained in his Islam, African Societies and Industrial Culture) are useful to understand the degree of faith he had in this spiritualist socialism as motivating force of development in Senegal.

“Islam must remind the Muslim world […] that if it is required to act, it is so that one may fulfill oneself, that one may achieve even richer being. For industrial development to be a boon and not the ruin of mankind, it is crucial that it retain a human dimension, that it not give rise to a new kind of slavery under the pretense  of promoting productivity or efficacy, that it not create progress that is in reality perversion, desire of well-being and not of better-being […]”

It is the philosophy of a modern Islam actively participating in a process of transformation of itself and of the world in conformity with demands of justice.

This interpretation of secularization put Senegal out of the heir of France (where takes the form of a permanent hostility to any manifestation of religion) and more in Anglo-Saxon model of relation between church and State: aim to guarantee the autonomy of religious communities.

Unfortunately, the reality happened to be different from the initial project as Senghor and Dia had to partially renounce to their ideas and had to accept a compromise pact to assure the support, especially during elections, of the marabouts (which thus became an integral part of the political life). Eventually, the demarcation between religion and politics was more blurred than what they initially hoped.

Publications 

Contribution à l'étude du mouvement coopératif en Afrique noire, Présence africaine, 1951
Réflexions sur l'économie de l'Afrique noire, Éditions africaines, 1954 
L'économie africaine : études et problèmes nouveaux, Presses universitaires de France, 1957
Nations africaines et solidarité mondiale, Presses universitaires de France, 1960
Islam, sociétés africaines et culture industrielle, Nouvelles éditions africaines, 1975
Essais sur l'Islam, vol. 1, Islam et humanisme, Nouvelles éditions africaines, 1977
Essais sur l'Islam, vol. 2, Socio-anthropologie de l'Islam, Nouvelles éditions africaines, 1979
Essais sur l'Islam, vol. 3, Islam et civilisations négro-africaines, Nouvelles éditions africaines, 1980
Mémoires d'un militant du Tiers monde : si mémoire ne ment, Publisud, 1985
A governance approach to civil service reform in Sub-Saharan Africa, World Bank, 1993
Africa's management in the 1990s and beyond : reconciling indigenous and transplanted institutions, World Bank, 1996
Kaso : le migrant perpétuel, Esprit frappeur, 1999
Afrique : le prix de la liberté, L'Harmattan, 2001 
Échec de l'alternance au Sénégal et crise du monde libéral, L'Harmattan, 2005
Sénégal, radioscopie d'une alternance avortée (articles)
Corbeille pour l'an 2000, Éditions Paix et développement, Dakar, 1995

Bibliography 

Pamela Cox and Richard Kessler. Après Senghor a Socialist Senegal?  African Affairs. Volume 79, Number 316. pp. 327–342
Souleymane Bachir Diagne, Religion and the Public Sphere in Senegal: The Evolution of a Project of Modernity in Miguel Vatter, ed., Crediting God: Sovereignty and Religion in the Age of Global Capitalism, Fordham University Press, 2011, pp. 102 – 114
Kaye Whiteman, Mamadou Dia, the Guardian, 2 Feb 2009.
 F. Diaye, M. Printz, Tine,  Visages publics au Sénégal. 10 personnalités politiques parlent, L'Harmattan, 1991, 260 p. 
 Babacar Ndiaye et Waly Ndiaye, Présidents et ministres de la République du Sénégal, Dakar, 2000.
(in French) Laurent Correau, Mamadou Dia, l’homme du refus, RFI.fr, 26 janvier 2009.
(in French) Valérie Nivelon and Maxime Grember, Mamadou Dia parle, histoire d’une archive inédite, RFI.fr, 25 janvier 2019.
(in French) Maâti Monjib, Mamadou Dia et les relations franco-sénégalaises (1957-1962), Horizons Maghrébins - Le droit à la mémoire,  Année 2005, pp. 40–53.

Filmography 

« La crise éclair qu'a vécue Dakar » (en ligne, un document audiovisuel de l'INA de 1' 23, retraçant la tentative de coup d'État de Mamadou Dia, diffusé à l'origine par les Actualités françaises le 26 décembre 1962)
« Le Sénégal après la crise » (en ligne, un document audiovisuel de l'INA de 7' 20, proposant un bilan après le coup d'État avorté de Mamadou Dia, diffusé à l'origine au cours du Journal télévisé de l'ORTF le 27 décembre 1962)

See also 
Politics of Senegal
History of Senegal
Mali Federation
Leopold Senghor

References

External links 
Senegal - History and Politics Institute for Security Studies, South Africa.
page on the French senate website
page on the French National Assembly website
page on the Republic of Senegal Interior Minister website

1910 births
2009 deaths
People from Thiès Region
People of French West Africa
Senegalese Democratic Bloc politicians
Senegalese socialists
Prime Ministers of Senegal
Interior ministers of Senegal
French Senators of the Fourth Republic
Senators of French West Africa
Deputies of the 3rd National Assembly of the French Fourth Republic
Deputies of the 1st National Assembly of the French Fifth Republic